"Vi vandt i dag" is a 2012 Danish language football themed song and a hit single by Danish hip hop duo Nik & Jay featuring Landsholdet (meaning the national football team in Danish).

Nik and Jay are shown on the cover of the single released, wearing the national football team red shirt jerseys with names Niclas and Jannik and team number 1.

Charts
The song has reached #2 in the Tracklisten, the Danish Singles Chart after release on Copenhagen Records / Universal Music.

References

2012 singles
Danish-language songs
Nik & Jay songs
Denmark at UEFA Euro 2012
2012 songs
Song articles with missing songwriters